Susanna Capurso (born 17 January 1958) is an Italian actress who works mainly in Germany. She is best known for the role of Sabrina Buchstab-Scholz in the German television series Lindenstraße.

Career
After international theater roles (including in France, Italy, Poland and Chile), Capurso made her German TV debut under the direction of Christian Quadflieg with Ein unvergessliches Wochenende in Venedig. In Germany, she was best known for her role as Sabrina Buchstab, later Scholz in the television series Lindenstraße, which she portrayed from 2005 to 2012.

She had theater engagements, among others. at the Komödie am Kurfürstendamm, at the Kammerspiele and at the Freie Volksbühne Berlin. In addition to Lindenstraße, she starred in TV series such as Cologne P.D. as Donatella Fiori, Für alle Fälle Stefanie, Neues vom Bülowbogen and in the TV comedies Die oder keine and Ein Banker zum Verhaben. In Alisa – Folge deinem Herzen, she portrayed the role of Francesca Bertani from episodes 66 to 75.

Partial filmography 
 2002: Swept Away
 2010: Letters to Juliet
 2015: Die Rosenheim-Cops
 2015: Monaco 110
 2018: Urlaub mit Mama
 2020: Bettys Diagnose

Personal life
Capurso is married and has a son from her first marriage to fellow actor Michael Kausch. She currently resides in Berlin.

References

External links 

 

1958 births
Living people
People from Barletta
Italian stage actresses
Italian film actresses
Italian television actresses
Italian expatriates in Germany
20th-century Italian actresses
21st-century Italian actresses